Pirhuani (possibly from Aymara pirwa, piwra granary, -ni a suffix to indicate ownership, "the one with a granary") is a mountain in the Vilcanota mountain range in the Andes of Peru, about  high. It is located in the Puno Region, Carabaya Province, Corani District. Pirhuani lies southwest of Macho Ritti. It is situated at the Lajamayu valley.

References

Mountains of Peru
Mountains of Puno Region